Planctogystia is a genus of moths of the family Cossidae.

Species
Planctogystia albiplagiata  (Gaede, 1930)
Planctogystia breviculus (Mabille, 1880)
Planctogystia brunneofasciatus (Gaede, 1930)
Planctogystia crassilineatus   (Gaede, 1930)
Planctogystia fulvosparsus (Butler, 1882)
Planctogystia gaedei   (Schoorl, 1990)
Planctogystia legraini   Yakovlev & Saldaitis, 2011
Planctogystia lemur   Yakovlev, 2009
Planctogystia olsoufieffae   Yakovlev, 2011
Planctogystia pavidus (Butler, 1882)
Planctogystia parvulus (Kenrick, 1914)
Planctogystia sakalava (Viette, 1958)
Planctogystia senex (Butler, 1882)

References

Cossinae